Lee Robert Martin (born 9 February 1987) is an English professional footballer. He can play as a winger or as a supporting striker for Dover Athletic.

Playing career

Manchester United
Martin began his career as a trainee with Wimbledon, where he caught the eye of many Premier League teams. Pursued by a number of other top clubs, including Arsenal, Liverpool and Tottenham Hotspur, he signed for Manchester United on 17 December 2003, following a week-long trial in October 2003, during which time he made one appearance for the Manchester United Under-19s team. The compensation package United paid Wimbledon is estimated to be approximately £1 million, with £200k being paid up front, and the rest in instalments based on both his and Manchester United's performance.

Over the remainder of the 2003–04 season, Martin made seven more appearances for United's various youth teams, and was even named as an unused substitute for the Reserves in January 2004. The following season, Martin began as a regular in the Under-18s, but he was soon promoted to the Reserve team, where he began to flourish, scoring goals as well as setting them up, including a hat-trick in one game against Bolton Wanderers Reserves. The 2005–06 season was even more auspicious for Martin; after being named on the bench for two UEFA Champions League group games, he finally made his first team debut in the League Cup against Barnet on 26 October 2005. He was substituted after 75 minutes, allowing Darron Gibson to make his own first team debut, but he was a constant threat to the Barnet goal.

Royal Antwerp (loan)
In January 2006, Martin joined United's feeder club, Belgian Second Division side Royal Antwerp in a loan deal until May 2006, to gain regular first team experience. During that short spell, he earned the Royal Antwerp Fans' Player of the Year award, and earned the fan-chosen Man of the Match award in five consecutive games. In the run-up to the 2006–07 season, Martin played in six of United's seven friendlies following their summer tour of South Africa. Their match against Celtic attracted the attention of Celtic's Glasgow rivals, Rangers, who sought to take him on loan for the first half of the season.

Rangers (loan)
Seen as not quite ready for the Premier League, Martin joined the Scottish club with a view to an extension of the loan to the end of the season. After a succession of injuries he failed to establish himself and returned to Manchester United in December 2006, having made just 10 appearances.

Stoke City (loan)
On 25 January 2007, he was farmed out on loan again, this time to Stoke City. He scored his first senior goal in Stoke's 2–1 win against Southampton on 10 March 2007; it was his only goal in his 14 appearances for the club.

Return to United
Martin returned to United for the 2007–08 season, and toured the Far East with the club in July 2007. He played in two of the four matches, and scored a spectacular goal against Chinese side Guangzhou Pharmaceutical on 27 July 2007, before being replaced by Patrice Evra. He was again named as an unused substitute for the Community Shield against Chelsea on 5 August 2007. Had he played in the game, it would have been his third game in as many days, having played a total of 149 minutes over the previous two games.

On 26 September 2007, Martin started the League Cup Third Round match against Coventry City, but, with United 1–0 down at half-time, he was substituted, Fraizer Campbell his replacement. However, United conceded again and were knocked out of the cup.

Plymouth Argyle (loan)
On 5 October 2007, he joined Championship side Plymouth Argyle on a three-month loan deal, with Plymouth beating three other Championship clubs to his signature. He scored his first Argyle goal in the 1–0 victory over Coventry City on 20 October 2007.

Martin discussed an extension to his loan with Sir Alex Ferguson on 2 January, but it was decided that Martin would return to Manchester United at the end of the spell on 5 January.

Sheffield United (loan)
However, on 10 January 2008, Sheffield United announced that they had managed to capture Martin on loan until the end of the season. Martin made his debut for the Blades in a 2–0 away defeat to local rivals Sheffield Wednesday but his loan spell was marred by a recurring knee injury and he returned to Old Trafford having only played nine games in total for the Blades.

In Manchester United's 2008 pre-season tour of South Arica, Martin scored United's winner against Orlando Pirates in their 1–0 win in the Vodacom Challenge.

Nottingham Forest (loan)
On 13 August 2008, Martin joined Nottingham Forest on a one-month loan. That evening, he made his first appearance for Forest in their League Cup clash against Morecambe. Forest won the match 4–0, but Martin was booked in the first half. Martin scored his first competitive goal for Forest on 23 August 2008, scoring the opening goal in a 3–2 win over Watford at the City Ground. On 29 August 2008, Nottingham Forest announced an extension of the loan deal until 31 December 2008.

Latter days at United
Upon returning from his loan, Martin was increasingly used by Ole Gunnar Solskjær in the Manchester United Reserve team as an attacking midfielder and makeshift striker, scoring five goals in the latter half of the season. He was also named as a substitute for the first team's home match against Aston Villa on 5 April 2009, but did not take to the field.

Martin made his first league start for Manchester United in the final match of the 2008–09 Premier League season at Hull City, as United rested key players for the Champions League Final.

Ipswich Town
Martin joined Ipswich Town on 6 July 2009 for an undisclosed fee thought to be around £1.5 million, signing a four-year contract with the club managed by former Manchester United captain Roy Keane. He made his debut for Ipswich in a friendly against Brentford on 15 July 2009, scoring a goal within eight minutes; Ipswich went on to win the game 3–1. His first competitive start for Ipswich came on 9 August 2009, in a Championship game with Coventry Martin scored his first competitive goal for Ipswich in a 3–3 draw away to Doncaster – it was his 8th appearance for the club. Martin was one of eight players made available for transfer by manager Roy Keane at the end of the 2009–10 season.

Charlton Athletic (loan)
On 6 August 2010, Martin joined League One club Charlton Athletic for the duration of the 2010–11 season.
He scored his first goal for the club in a League Cup match against Shrewsbury Town on 10 August 2010. He scored his only two league goals for Charlton in a 5–1 victory against Peterborough United at London Road. He was recalled by Ipswich on 18 January 2011.

Ipswich Town return
With Paul Jewell being appointed manager, he recalled Martin back from loan. Martin scored his second goal for the club on 6 August 2011 in the season's opening game at Bristol City. Martin has been a regular player under Paul Jewell and has made 26 appearances, scoring five goals. He was released by Mick McCarthy at the end of the 2012–13 season.

Millwall
On 4 July 2013, Martin joined Championship club Millwall on a one-year contract. He signed a two-year extension on 17 June 2014. In January 2016 Martin went out on loan to Northampton Town. He was released by Millwall at the end of the 2015–16 season.

Gillingham
On 6 July 2016 he joined League One club Gillingham on a two-year contract. He suffered a serious ankle injury in a pre-season friendly at the end of the month and early indications were that he would miss the entire season as a result, but he eventually returned to action in February 2017 making his debut against Port Vale in a 1–1 draw.

On 3 August 2017 he was named as Gillingham captain by manager Adrian Pennock. He was released by Gillingham at the end of the 2017–18 season.

Exeter City
Following his release from Gillingham, Martin joined Exeter City. He made 77 appearances and scored 8 goals over two seasons at the club, helping Exeter reach the 2020 EFL League Two play-off Final. He was released following the end of his contract in July 2020.

Ebbsfleet United
He joined National League South side Ebbsfleet United on 29 July, following his release from Exeter City.

Dover Athletic
On 4 July 2022, Martin joined recently relegated National League South club Dover Athletic.

Career statistics

Honours
Manchester United
FA Community Shield: 2007

References

External links

Profile at StretfordEnd.co.uk

1987 births
Living people
Sportspeople from Taunton
English footballers
Association football midfielders
Wimbledon F.C. players
Manchester United F.C. players
Royal Antwerp F.C. players
Rangers F.C. players
Stoke City F.C. players
Plymouth Argyle F.C. players
Sheffield United F.C. players
Nottingham Forest F.C. players
Ipswich Town F.C. players
Charlton Athletic F.C. players
Millwall F.C. players
Northampton Town F.C. players
Gillingham F.C. players
Exeter City F.C. players
Ebbsfleet United F.C. players
Dover Athletic F.C. players
Scottish Premier League players
English Football League players
Premier League players
National League (English football) players
Expatriate footballers in Belgium
English expatriate sportspeople in Belgium